YaYa's Flame Broiled Chicken (also known by the stylistic variant YAYA's Flame Broiled Chicken) is an American fast food restaurant chain based in Flint, Michigan. Its specialty is flame-broiled chicken. It was started in 1985 by brothers Constantine "Gus" and John Chinonis in Florida. Stores later opened in Georgia, Michigan, Ohio, and Minnesota. Its current locations are in Florida and Michigan, with the greatest concentration in the Genesee County area.

References

External links 
 

Fast-food chains of the United States
Fast-food franchises
Fast-food poultry restaurants
Regional restaurant chains in the United States
Economy of Flint, Michigan
Restaurants in Michigan
Restaurants in Florida
Restaurants established in 1985
1985 establishments in Florida
Companies based in Flint, Michigan
Chicken chains of the United States